Shishir Ravindran Kurup (born November 2, 1961) is an American actor. He  played Dr. Singh on the sci-fi series Surface, and also had roles on the series Heroes, Lost and True Blood.

He made a guest appearance as Dr. Singh in Good Luck Charlie with Bridgit Mendler and after that, he played Mo Banjaree's father in Lemonade Mouth, reuniting with Mendler, who portrayed shy and innocent Olivia White, and becoming close friends with his co-star and T.V daughter, Naomi Scott and her parents, eventually visiting them in London after shooting the movie. 
Kurup was born in Bombay, India of Malayali background, the son of Bhavani and Ravi Kurup.

Kurup is also a playwright and theatrical director, and a member of the Cornerstone Theater Company in Los Angeles.

References

External links

Community Arts Network Piece talking about his play "Vishnu's Dream"

Note- Shishir played Mo Banjaree's father in the Disney Channel Original Movie Lemonade Mouth

1961 births
Living people
American Hindus
Indian emigrants to the United States
American dramatists and playwrights of Indian descent
American male actors of Indian descent
American male television actors
American people of Malayali descent
Place of birth missing (living people)